Chiddingfold is a village and civil parish in the Weald in the Waverley district of Surrey, England. It lies on the A283 road between Milford and Petworth. The parish includes the hamlets of Ansteadbrook, High Street Green and Combe Common.

Chiddingfold Forest, a Site of Special Scientific Interest, lies mostly within its boundaries.

History

The name of Chiddingfold 'Chadynge's fold', is derived from the Saxon, probably meaning the fold (enclosure for animals) "in the hollow".

Chiddingfold has an historic link to glass-making.  John Aubrey, the 17th century antiquary, mistakenly claimed there were no fewer than eleven glassworks in Chiddingfold, however, as Kenyon states in his authoritative The Glass Industry of the Weald, Leicester University Press 1967, p.7, there were probably no more than twelve in the whole of Surrey. Window glass made in Chiddingfold in the mid-fourteenth century was used in some of the finest buildings in the land, including St Stephen's Chapel, Westminster, and St George's Chapel, Windsor. but most fine glass was imported from the Continent.

The Guy Fawkes festivities saw in 1887 the village policeman's house attacked by a mob – he was later transferred elsewhere – he may have set the fire early or failed to prevent it from being lit before time. The event of 1929 faced wider unrest, culminating a week later with talk of ducking innocent Sgt Brake into the pond being stalled by 200 Surrey officers using specially requisitioned buses; the village pubs were ordered to close and a JP was on hand to read the Riot Act should it have proved necessary.

There was, from a date in the 19th century until the early 20th century, a tile and brickworks, extracting and processing the clay underlying the parish.

Chiddingfold has an archive which shows the history of Chiddingfold and the previous owners of Chiddingfold houses.

Amenities

The Crown Inn

The Crown Inn is one of the oldest inns in England. Built as a rest house for Cistercian monks on their pilgrimage from Winchester to the shrine of Thomas Becket in Canterbury, it claims to have been established in 1285 with the earliest recorded reference to the present building dated 1383; probably when the alehouse (the Halle) expanded to include accommodation, thus becoming an inn. Subsequently, it merged with the adjoining alehouse through common ownership. The Crown has seen many distinguished visitors down the years. In 1552, Edward VI, the "boy king", attended by high officials of state, courtiers, peers and some 4000 men encamped on the village green. It is reputed that in 1591 his elder sister, Queen Elizabeth I, "sojourned there for refreshment" en route from Loseley Park to Cowdray Park: her expense roll for the journey showing two shillings being paid for a tonne of wine to be transported to the village from Ripley.

Other

A church (St Mary's), pond, shops and houses lie on three sides of the village green, with the forge on it. Almost half of the land is forested, matching its location within Anglo Saxon England, within The Weald.

The Chiddingfold Scout Group is very active with about 100 boys and girls as Beavers, Cubs and Scouts.

Chiddingfold Cricket Club has active first and second teams that compete in the L'Anson League and is welcome to new members. The club has an active junior section. Children in school years 1 to 6 train on Friday evenings throughout the summer term, with around 100 participating each week. Friday training has become an important social occasion aiding anyone in need of a drink and a burger at the end of the week.  Older children train on Wednesday evening and winter training runs for all ages between Christmas and the start of the cricket season. The junior club actively competes in the Berkley Sport Two Counties League at every age group.

Chiddingfold has a substantial doctors' surgery.

Events

The village is known for its torchlit procession, bonfire and fireworks display on the Saturday evening closest to 5 November (Guy Fawkes Day). A village festival is also held every year on the village green on the 2nd Sunday in June.

Hamlets

Ansteadbrook

In the hamlet itself Petworth Road, a road east from Haslemere forms a junction with Killinghurst Lane that leads towards Chiddingfold, where all the cottages are yet there are a remarkable line of four listed buildings for such a tiny settlement further along Petworth Road near the border with West Sussex are Benham's Stud Farm and its Barn, Huntingfords and Cherry Tree Cottage.

Highstreet Green

Combe Common
At the western fringe of the village centre is this common which plays host to events in the summer, and which residents of nearby roads sometimes include as their locality.

Religion

The Saint Teresa of Avila Catholic Church dates from 1959.

Media links
The village was the setting for the 1946 film The Years Between starring Michael Redgrave and Valerie Hobson.The rock band The Stranglers, then called The Guildford Stranglers, were based in Chiddingfold during their key formative period in the mid-seventies, sometimes using the name The Chiddingfold Chokers and frequenting The Crown Inn. The rock band Genesis built their studio The Farm in the parish in the early 1980s; they also rehearsed at the Chiddingfold Ex-Servicemen's Club and side-project Mike + The Mechanics shot the video for their 1995 hit, "Over My Shoulder", on the village cricket green.

Chiddingfold is referred to in a Mr. Cholmondley-Warner sketch from Harry Enfield's TV series, in which a newsreel – supposedly from 1940 – looks forward to "life in 1990" and predicts that the United States would have come back under British rule, with New York City renaming itself "Chiddingfold-on-Sea".

Demography and housing

The average level of accommodation in the region composed of detached houses was 28%, the average that was apartments was 22.6%.

The proportion of households in the civil parish who owned their home outright compares to the regional average of 35.1%.  The proportion who owned their home with a loan compares to the regional average of 32.5%.  The remaining % is made up of rented dwellings (plus a negligible % of households living rent-free).

Notable residents
The economist and ecological writer David Fleming was born in Chiddingfold in 1940, to Gold Dagger award-winning crime writer Joan Margaret Fleming.

Socialite Viva Seton Montgomerie spent her final years in the village, until her death in 1959.

The French-born abstract artist François Lanzi lived in Chiddingfold from 1971 until his death in 1988.

The progressive rock band Genesis purchased a farm in Chiddingfold in 1980 and re-modeled one of the buildings into a recording studio.  Known as The Farm the band began recording there in 1981 and the individual members of the band have also recorded solo albums there.

References

Further reading
 Alan Bott, A Guide to the Parish Church of Saint Mary, Chiddingfold, Surrey, 2009, 
 David Graham and Audrey Graham, with a contribution by Phil Jones, "Recent investigations on the site of the Roman buildings at White Beech, Chiddingfold" (abstract; download links), Surrey Archaeological Collections, 96, 175–189, 2011,

External links

 Chiddingfold Village official website
 Chiddingfold Archive
 Stained Glass Windows at St. Mary, Chiddingfold, Surrey
 Stained Glass Windows at St. Teresa (RC), Chiddingfold, Surrey
 

Borough of Waverley
Civil parishes in Surrey
Villages in Surrey